Blood, Chet and Tears is a studio album by jazz trumpeter Chet Baker recorded in 1970 and released on the Verve label.

Reception

Allmusic rated the album with 1½ stars stating "Blood, Chet & Tears is legendary for being one of the most shameful releases in his catalog, but the reality of the album isn't quite as bad as the legend behind it... Blood, Chet & Tears finds Baker trying to sound like somebody else and that's the worst thing about the album. It literally sounds like Baker is hiding his true musical personality rather than expanding upon that personality. And when you come right down to it, that really is selling out as opposed to what George Benson and others were doing during this same period".

Track listing
 "Easy Come, Easy Go" (Jack Keller, Diane Hildebrand) – 2:51   
 "Sugar, Sugar" (Jeff Barry, Andy Kim) – 2:52   
 "Something" (George Harrison) – 3:20   
 "Spinning Wheel" (David Clayton-Thomas) – 3:16   
 "Vehicle" (Jim Peterik) – 2:44   
 "The Letter" (Wayne Carson Thompson) – 3:34   
 "And When I Die" (Laura Nyro) – 2:57   
 "Come Saturday Morning" (Fred Karlin, Dory Previn) – 2:48   
 "Evil Ways" (Clarence "Sonny" Henry) – 3:35   
 "You've Made Me So Very Happy" (Brenda Holloway, Patrice Holloway, Frank Wilson, Berry Gordy) – 3:40

Personnel
Chet Baker – trumpet, vocals
Tony Terran, Ray Triscari, Ollie Mitchell – trumpet
Miles Anderson, Dick Hyde, – trombone
George Roberts – bass trombone
Plas Johnson – tenor saxophone
Buddy Collette – reeds
Larry Knechtel – keyboards
Al Casey, Mike Deasy, Joe Pass, Tommy Tedesco – guitar
Joe Osborn, Ray Pohlman – electric bass
Hal Blaine – drums
Gary Coleman – percussion
The Sid Sharp Strings arranged and conducted by Jerry Styner

References 

1970 albums
Chet Baker albums
Verve Records albums